Spirits Dancing in the Flesh is the sixteenth studio album by Santana. It reached eighty-five in the Billboard 200.

Track listing
"Let There Be Light/Spirits Dancing in the Flesh" (Carlos Santana, Chester D. Thompson) – 7:20
"Gypsy Woman" (Curtis Mayfield) – 4:29
"It's a Jungle Out There" (Santana) – 4:32
"Soweto (Africa Libre)" (Santana, Thompson, Alphonso Johnson) – 5:06
"Choose" (Santana, Thompson, Alex Ligertwood) – 4:14
"Peace on Earth...Mother Earth...Third Stone from the Sun" (John Coltrane, Santana, Jimi Hendrix) – 4:26
"Full Moon" (Paolo Rustichelli) – 4:31
"Who's That Lady" (Rudolph Isley, Ronald Isley, O'Kelly Isley, Jr., Ernie Isley, Marvin Isley, Chris Jasper) – 4:15
"Jin-go-lo-ba" (Babatunde Olatunji) – 4:46
"Goodness and Mercy" (Santana, Thompson) – 4:30

Personnel
Band
 Carlos Santana – guitar, vocals, percussion
 Alex Ligertwood – vocals, rhythm guitar
 Benny Rietveld – bass guitar
 Chester D. Thompson – keyboards, Hammond B3, horns, vocals
 Armando Peraza – bongos, congas, percussion
 Walfredo Reyes – drums, timbales, percussion

Guest musicians
 Vernon Reid – guitar
 Alphonso Johnson – bass
 Keith Jones – bass
 Paolo Rustichelli – keyboards, acoustic piano
 Wayne Shorter – soprano sax, tenor sax
 Bobby Womack – lead vocals
 Tramaine Hawkins – lead vocals
 Oren Waters – background vocals
 Kevin Dorsey – background vocals
 Jim Gilstrap – background vocals
 Rashan Hylton – background vocals
 Phillip Ingram – background vocals
 Hugh "Sweetfoot" Maynard – background vocals
 Stephen King – vocals
 Orestes Vilató – timbales, vocals
 Raul Rekow – congas, vocals
 Francisco Aguabella – congas

Additional musicians
 Devon Bernardoni – keyboards
 Charisse Dancy – choir
 Sandra Hunter – choir
 Marjo Keller – choir
 Lynice Pinkard – choir
 Lovetta Brown – choir
 De Anna Brown – choir
 Kevin Swan Butler – choir
 Darryl Williams – choir
 Edwin M. Harper, Jr. – choir direction

Production
 Sergio Albonico – executive producer
 Chris Becker – engineering assistance
 Devon Bernardoni – engineering, mixing
 Paul Ericksen – engineering, mixing
 Arne Frager – mixing
 Lori Fumar – engineering assistance
 Jim Gaines – engineering, mixing, production
 Bernie Kirsh – engineering
 David Leonard – mixing
 Stephen Marcussen – mastering
 Diego Uchitel – photography
 Bob Venosa – design
 Peter Wolf – arranging, production

Charts

References

Santana (band) albums
1990 albums
Columbia Records albums
Albums produced by Carlos Santana